Marilyn Fox is a British television producer, director and writer, who was strongly associated with BBC children's programmes from the 1960s to the 1990s, working on many drama series and enjoying a long association with Jackanory.

Her credits include:

 Jackanory (119 episodes, 1967–1991)
 The Island of the Great Yellow Ox (1971, as adapter)
 Treasure Over the Water (1972)
 Carrie's War (1974, as adapter)
 King Thrushbeard and the Proud Princess (1974)
 The Day I Shot My Dad (1976)
 Graham's Gang (1977)
 Spine Chillers (1980)
 Our John Willie (1980)
 The Bells of Astercote (1980)
 Codename Icarus (1981)
 The Toy Princess (1981)
 With My Little Eye (1982)
 The Baker Street Boys (1983)
 Seaview (1983)
 Running Scared (1986)
 The Cuckoo Sister (1986)
 The Chronicles of Narnia: The Lion, the Witch and the Wardrobe (1988)
 Not the End of the World (1989)
 Five Children and It (1991: aka The Sand Fairy on its American video release)
 Archer's Goon (1992)
 The Return of the Psammead (1993: aka The Return of It on its American DVD release, and The Return of the Sand Fairy on its American video release)
 Earthfasts (1994)
 Agent Z and the Penguin from Mars'' (1996)

References

Year of birth missing (living people)
British television directors
BBC people
Living people